The Star-Wagon was a 1937 Broadway drama written by Maxwell Anderson,
produced and staged by Guthrie McClintic, with scenic design by Jo Mielziner and musical direction by 
Albert Pearl. It ran for 223 performances from September 29, 1937 to April 1938 at the Empire Theatre.

Plot

A fantasy of time-travel

Cast

 Burgess Meredith as Stephen Minch	
 Lillian Gish as Martha Minch	
 Whitner Bissell as Park	
 J. Arthur Young as Mr. Arlington	
 Jane Buchanan as Hallie Arlington	
 Howard Freeman as	Apfel	
 Mildred Natwick as Mrs. Rutledge	
 Edmund O'Brien as Paul Reiger	
 John Philliber as	Misty	
 Kent Smith as	Duffy	
 William Garner as	Oglethorpe	
 Russell Collins as Hanus Wicks	
 Edith Smith as Della	
 Muriel Starr as Angela and as herb woman	
 Barry Kelley as first thug
 Charles Forrester as second thug
 Evelyn Abbott as Christabel	
 Alan Anderson as Ripple

Adaptations

N.Y. Times, Jan. 7, 1938:  “The purchase of Maxwell Anderson’s ‘The Star Wagon’ was made today by Selznick International as a vehicle for Janet Gaynor. The play, which is being given on Broadway, will go before the cameras in the Autumn.”   Gaynor retired her film career with The Young in Heart, released in November 1938, and the motion picture was never made.

The play was videotaped for television as a 1966 installment of NET Playhouse, directed by Karl Genus and starring Orson Bean, Eileen Brennan and Dustin Hoffman. (NET, for National Educational Television, was the original name of what would become PBS for Public Broadcasting Service.)

External links 
 
 

Plays by Maxwell Anderson
1937 plays
Broadway plays
Plays set in Ohio
American plays adapted into films